Invaders from the Dark is a horror novel by American writer Greye La Spina.  It was published by Arkham House in 1960 in an edition of 1,559 copies.  It was La Spina's first and only hardcover book.

The novel was originally serialized in Weird Tales magazine.  It appeared in the April, May and June, 1925 issues.

Plot summary

The story is set in Brooklyn, New York in the mid-1920s and deals with the widow of an Occultist, Portia Differdale, and Princess Tchernova, a wealthy and beautiful Russian werewolf.  Both women desire the same man, Owen Edwardes.

Sources

External links
 Invaders from the Dark at the Internet Archive: 
 Part 1
 Part 2
 Part 3

1960 American novels
American horror novels
Novels first published in serial form
Works originally published in Weird Tales
Works published under a pseudonym
Novels set in Brooklyn
1925 American novels
1925 debut novels